The Bagramyan Battalion, also known officially as the Independent Motorized Rifle Battalion named after Marshal Ivan Khristoforovich Baghramyan was a unit formed in Abkhazia and predominantly composed of ethnic Armenians living in Abkhazia that fought together with separatist Abkhaz forces during the War in Abkhazia (1992–93). Named in honour of the Soviet Armenian Marshal Ivan Bagramyan, the battalion fought against the forces of Georgia. It was subsequently disbanded.

Together with other Abkhazian groups, they were able to ethnically cleanse the region of Georgians, forcing some 250,000 to flee. The Battalion was reported to have been disbanded in 1996, but in 1998 a high-profile terrorist attack in Georgia was attributed to it.

A total of 1,500 Armenians participated in the war, a quarter of the Abkhazian army. Twenty Armenians were awarded the highest honor Hero of Abkhazia and 242 were killed in battle. The first President of Abkhazia Vladislav Ardzinba praised the high discipline, organization, and accomplishments of the Bagramyan Battalion.

History
After the beginning of the Abkhaz–Georgian conflict in 1992, Georgian troops entered the territory of Abkhazia and started to commit atrocities against non-Georgians, including the Armenian population. Although the Armenians of Abkhazia originally wished to remain neutral, the looting and violence committed by the Georgian army, including reports of rape and murder, had consequently caused Armenians to favor the Abkhazian side. The Armenians of the Gagra community, which had an Armenian majority, convened a meeting of leadership where it was decided to officially support the Abkhazs and take up arms against the Georgians. A Sukhumi-based Armenian newspaper reported:

An Armenian motorized infantry battalion named after Marshal of the Soviet Union Ivan Bagramyan was established under Vagharshak Kosyan on 9 February 1993 and became part of the Abkhazian armed forces. Combat vehicles of the battalion were decorated with the Armenian flag. The battalion also included women in medical platoons.

The first fight that involved the battalion, under the command of a company led by Levon Daschyan, was during the second assault Sukhum on 15–16 March 1993. Afterwards the battalion captured a strategic and well-fortified bridge over the Gumista River.

The battalion was later joined by Nagorno-Karabakh soldiers who fought in the ranks of the Nagorno-Karabakh Defense Army for the First Nagorno-Karabakh War. They, as well as professional soldiers, including those employed under a contract, were involved in the preparations of the battalion. A second Armenian battalion was organized in Gagra. The estimated total of Armenians participants of the war is about 1,500, a quarter of the Abkhazian army.

In September 1993, after fruitless negotiations, the Abkhaz side started an operation against Georgian forces in the Battle of Sukhumi, which was attended by both the Bagramyan Battalion. From 25–27 September, Armenian units marched deep into the city from the village Yashtuha and crawl down the street along the Besletka Chanba River. Armenians first came to the building of the Council of Ministers, the base of authority over the capital. During the storming of the city, Armenian soldiers captured 25 prisoners.

After the capture of Sukhumi, the Bagramyan Battalion was deployed in the Kodori Valley, where it was tasked to protect Armenian-populated villages. In March 1994, it began operations to capture the village of Lata. During these final stages, the battalion was commanded by Sergei Matosyan, who was the only Armenian of the war to command Abkhaz troops.

After the arrival of peacekeeping personnel, the battalion disbanded. Twenty Armenians were awarded the highest honor Hero of Abkhazia and 242 were killed in battle. The first President of Abkhazia Vladislav Ardzinba praised the high discipline, organization, and accomplishments of the Bagramyan Battalion.

The battalion was reported to have been disbanded in 1995 or 1996. Georgian reports claimed it was still active in 1998 when a fire in one of administrative buildings of the power grid in Mziuri shortly before the Six-Day War in Abkhazia (20–26 May 1998) was attributed to the battalion. In 2001 Former members of the battalion later took part in defending the Armenian majority Gulripshi District from the Chechen militant groups of Ruslan Gelayev.

See also

References

Abkhaz–Georgian conflict
Military units and formations of Abkhazia